Zheng Saisai was the defending champion but chose not to participate.

Lucrezia Stefanini won the title, defeating Marina Bassols Ribera in the final, 3–6, 6–1, 7–6(7–3).

Seeds

Draw

Finals

Top half

Bottom half

References

External Links
Main Draw

Caldas da Rainha Ladies Open - Singles